is a Japanese manga series written and illustrated by Est Em. It was serialized in Shogakukan's seinen manga magazine Monthly Ikki from June 2011 to September 2014, when the magazine ceased its publication, and the series finished with its fifth volume in December of the same year.

Plot
Hopeless, wandering down the road in the rain at night, Chica is about to be run over by a car driven by a man named . Antonio decides to help and takes her to his home; the next morning, Chica, mad at him because he did not kill her and wondering if Maria left her for being a woman, asks him if things would have been different if she were a man. Antonio, who used to be a bullfighting apoderado (a bullfighting manager), says that he would suggest Chica to become a matador if she were a man. Chica, makes up her mind and decides to become a bullfighter and die by the horns of a bull. Antonio, hesitant at first, takes her to the Plaza de toros de la Real Maestranza, Seville, to show her the risks of being a bullfighter. There, Chica sees a corrida de toros, where a bull is killed; Chica, however, without feeling discouraged about what she saw, driven by her desire to die and by the intention to prove that a woman can become a matador, decides to start her training as a bullfighter under Antonio's instructions.

Publication
Written and illustrated by Est Em, Golondrina was serialized in Shogakukan's seinen manga magazine Monthly Ikki from June 25, 2011, to September 25, 2014, when the magazine ceased its publication and it was announced that series would continue publication via collected tankōbon volumes. Shogakukan released the first volume on February 29, 2012. It was firstly announced that the series would end with six volumes; however, the fifth and last volume was released on December 26, 2014.

Volume list

References

Further reading

External links
 

Bullfighting books
Comics set in Spain
Drama anime and manga
LGBT in anime and manga
Seinen manga
Shogakukan manga